Opan Municipality is located in Bulgaria. The administrative centre is in Opan. It has an area of 257.5 square kilometres, has 3 358 inhabitants  and includes the following 13 places:

 Bashtino
 Byal Izvor
 Byalo Pole
 Knyazhevsko
 Kravino
 Opan
 Pastren
 Sredets
 Stoletovo
 Trakiya
 Vasil Levski
 Venets
 Yastrebovo

Demography

Religion 
According to the latest Bulgarian census of 2011, the religious composition, among those who answered the optional question on religious identification, was the following:

References

External links
 Opan municipality page at the Stara Zagora Province website 

Geography of Stara Zagora Province